Liquid organic hydrogen carriers (LOHC) are organic compounds that can absorb and release hydrogen through chemical reactions. LOHCs can therefore be used as storage media for hydrogen. In principle, every unsaturated compound (organic molecules with C-C double or triple bonds) can take up hydrogen during hydrogenation. The sequence of endothermal dehydrogenation followed by hydrogen purification is considered as the main drawback which limits the overall efficiency of the storage cycle.

In 2020, Japan built up the world's first international hydrogen supply chain between Brunei and Kawasaki City utilizing toluene-based LOHC technology. Hyundai Motor invests in the development for stationary and on-board LOHC-systems.

Principle of LOHC-based hydrogen storage
To absorb hydrogen, the dehydrated form of LOHC (an unsaturated, mostly aromatic compound) reacts with the hydrogen in a hydrogenation reaction. The hydrogenation is an exothermic reaction and is carried out at elevated pressures (approx. 30-50 bar) and temperatures of approx. 150-200°C in the presence of a catalyst. The corresponding saturated compound is thereby formed, which can be stored or transported under ambient conditions. If the hydrogen is needed again, the now hydrogenated, hydrogen-rich form of the LOHC is dehydrogenated, with the hydrogen being released again from the LOHC. This reaction is endothermic and takes place at elevated temperatures (250-320°C) again in the presence of a catalyst. Before the hydrogen can be used, it may have to be cleaned of LOHC steam. To increase efficiency, the heat contained in the hot material flow exiting the release unit should be transferred to the cold material flow consisting of hydrogen-rich LOHC entering the release unit in order to keep the energy requirement for preheating it before the reaction low.
In particular, the heat released by the hydrogenation reaction when the hydrogen is absorbed can in principle be used for heating purposes or as process heat.

Requirements for LOHC materials

Determination of the degree of hydrogenation

Direct LOHC fuel cell
An alternative, innovative and highly promising approach to convert LOHC-bound hydrogen into electricity is proposed recently. The new unloading sequence consists of an almost thermoneutral catalysed transfer hydrogenation step converting ketone (acetone) to secondary alcohol (2-propanol) by contacting hydrogen-rich carrier (H18-DBT), and the secondary alcohol is then directly consumed in a PEMFC (direct isopropanol fuel cell; DIPAFC). It is a CO2 emission-free, external energy input-free, and safe sequence with no molecular hydrogen at any point during hydrogen releasing. The "direct LOHC fuel cell" based on the LOHC-DIPAFC coupling concept is a very attractive solution for the on-board generation of electric energy in mobile applications, and it's driving researchers to focus on the topic.

Examples of LOHC materials

Toluene / methylcyclohexane
As early as the 1980s there were attempts with toluene, which is converted to methylcyclohexane by hydrogenation. The basic idea of this variant came from the USA in 1975 and was further developed in 1979 at the Paul Scherrer Institute in Switzerland together with the ETH Zurich. Even then, the prototype of a truck was built that was powered by hydrogen from the dehydrogenation of methylcyclohexane. The entire circuit is known as the Methylcyclohexan-Toluol-H2 system (MTH).

N-ethyl carbazole

Dibenzyltoluene
To circumvent the high melting temperature of N-ethylcarbazole and the high vapor pressure of toluene, dibenzyltoluene can be used. This substance is currently being used as a heat transfer oil. Temperatures of approx. 300°C are necessary for dehydrogenation. However, dibenzyltoluene is superior to other carrier substances in many physico-chemical properties.

Other potential LOHCs

Implementation

References

Hydrogen technologies